William Dowdeswell PC (12 March 17216 February 1775) was a British politician who was a leader of the Rockingham Whig faction.

Background and education
A son of William Dowdeswell of Pull Court, Bushley, Worcestershire, he was educated at Westminster School, at Christ Church, Oxford, then at the University of Leiden.
One of his fellow students was Baron d'Holbach. He spent the summer of 1746 with him at the Heeze-Leende estate of his uncle, Messire François-Adam, Baron d'Holbach, Seigneur de Heeze, Leende et autres Lieux (ca. 1675–1753).

Political career
Dowdeswell became member of Parliament for the family borough of Tewkesbury in 1747, retaining this seat until 1754, and from 1761 until his death he was one of the representatives of Worcestershire. Becoming prominent among the Whigs, Dowdeswell was made Chancellor of the Exchequer in 1765 under the Marquess of Rockingham, and his short tenure of this position appears to have been a successful one, he being in Lecky's words a good financier, but nothing more.

To general astonishment, he refused to abandon his friends and to take office under Chatham, who succeeded Rockingham in August 1766. Dowdeswell then led the Rockingham party in the House of Commons, taking an active part in debate until his death.

In 1774 during the Parliamentary debate of the Boston Port Act he warned the act will "soon inflame all America, and stir up a contention you will not be able to pacify and quiet".

Family and death
Dowdeswell married Bridget, daughter of Sir William Codrington, 1st Baronet, in 1747.  The couple are believed to have had as many as 15 children, including Charles William Dowdeswell (b. 8 June 1756). 

Dowdeswell went abroad to recover his health in 1774 but died the next February in Nice. The highly eulogistic epitaph on his monument at Bushley was written by Edmund Burke.

References

Chancellors of the Exchequer of Great Britain
Members of the Parliament of Great Britain for Worcestershire
People educated at Westminster School, London
Alumni of Christ Church, Oxford
People from Malvern Hills District
1721 births
1775 deaths
British MPs 1747–1754
British MPs 1761–1768
British MPs 1768–1774
British MPs 1774–1780